In ancient Roman religion, a  lūcus (plural lūcī) is a sacred grove.

Lucus was one of four Latin words meaning in general "forest, woodland, grove" (along with nemus, silva, and saltus), but unlike the others it was primarily used as a religious designation. Servius defines the lucus as "a large number of trees with a religious significance," as distinguished from the silva, a natural forest, and a nemus, an arboretum that is not consecrated. A saltus usually implied a wilderness area with varied topographical features.

A lucus was a cultivated place, more like a wooded park than a forest, and might contain an aedes, a building that housed the image of a god, or other landscaped features that facilitated or gave rise to ritual. It has been conjectured, for instance, that the Lupercal, referred to as a "cave," was a small lucus with an artificial grotto, since archaeology has uncovered no natural cave in the area.

Apuleius records that "when pious travelers happen to pass by a sacred grove (lucus) or a cult place on their way, they are used to make a vow (votum), or a fruit offering, or to sit down for a while." What the Romans understood by religio lay in these ritual gestures, and not in contemplation.

Etymology
Some ancient sources as well as modern etymologists derive the word  "from a letting in of light" (a lucendo); that is, the lucus was the clearing encompassed by trees. The Old High German cognate lôh also means "clearing, holy grove." Lucus appears to have been understood in this sense in early medieval literature; until the 10th century, it is regularly translated into OHG as harug, a word never used for the secular silva. Servius, however, somewhat perversely says that a lucus is so called because non luceat, "it is not illuminated," perhaps implying that a proper sacred grove hosted only legitimate daytime ceremonies and not dubious nocturnal rites that required torchlight.

To clear a clearing
In his book On Agriculture, Cato records a Roman ritual lucum conlucare, "to clear a clearing." The officiant is instructed to offer a pig as a piaculum, a propitiation or expiatory offering made in advance of the potential wrong committed against the grove through human agency. The following words are to be formulated (verba concipito) for the particular site:
Whether thou be god or goddess (si deus, si dea) to whom this grove is dedicated, as it is thy right to receive a sacrifice of a pig for the thinning of this sacred grove, and to this intent, whether I or one at my bidding do it, may it be rightly done. To this end, in offering this pig to thee I humbly beg that thou wilt be gracious and merciful to me, to my house and household, and to my children. Wilt thou deign to receive this pig which I offer thee to this end.

The word piaculum is repeated three times in the prayer, emphasizing that the sacrifice of the pig is not a freewill offering, but something owed to the deity by right (ius). The piaculum compensates the deity for a transgression or offense, and differs from a regular sacrifice offered in the hope of procuring favor in return (do ut des).

It is tempting, but misleading, to read ecological principles into ritualized agriculture; for the early Romans, respect was the partner of fear in their regard for the divine forces in nature, and the open invocation with which this prayer begins is a contractual "out" or hedge. The piaculum was a guarantee that the action of clearing was valid. Thoreau nonetheless made admiring reference to Cato's prayer in Walden: "I would that our farmers when they cut down a forest felt some of that awe which old Romans did when they came to thin, or let in the light to, a consecrated grove (lucum conlucare)."

Festival of the grove

The Lucaria ("Grove Festival") was held on July 19 and 21, according to the Fasti Amiterni, a calendar dating from the reign of Tiberius found at Amiternum (now S. Vittorino) in Sabine territory.

Sacred groves of the Roman Empire
A lucus might become such a focus of activity that a community grew up around it, as was the case with the Lucus Augusti that is now Lugo in Spain and the Lucus Feroniae near Capena. Lucus is therefore part of the Latin name of several different ancient places in the Roman Empire from which the modern name derives, including:

Lucus Angitiae ("Sacred Grove of Angitia"), now Luco dei Marsi, a town in Italy
Lucus Pisaurensis, the Sacred Grove of Pesaro, Italy; discovered by Annibale degli Abati Olivieri, an 18th-century Italian aristocrat 
Lucus Augusti, the name of multiple sites, such as:
Lugo, the city in Spain
Luc-en-Diois, in France
Lucus Feroniae ("Sacred Grove of Feronia") or Feronia, a now-disappeared city in Etruria, Italy; see Torre di Terracina, Italy

See also
Fanum
Lucina (goddess)
Nemeton

References

Trees in religion
Ancient Roman religion